Japanese Mahjong scoring rules are used for Japanese Mahjong, a game for four players common in Japan. The rules were organized in the Taishō to Shōwa period as the game became popular. 

The scoring system uses structural criteria as well as bonuses. Player start scores may be set to any value.  Usually, it is set to 20,000 to 30,000 points. Scores are counted using sticks of 10,000 points, 5,000 points, 1,000 points and 100 points. A game often ends when all the points of a player are lost, which is a situation called hakoten, dobon, buttobi, etc.  However, some settings allow the game to continue, even if a player's score dropped below zero.

There are two criteria for determining the winning points: han and fu, which correspond to a points table. Han is the unit for the value of yaku, which are particular patterns or conditions of a hand.  Fu is the value of melds, waits and "going out".

Steps of calculation
The payment to the winner of a hand is calculated as follows:
1. Counting han (飜)
2. If it is five han or more, it is mangan (満貫) or more and the calculation of basic points is omitted
3. Counting fu (符)
4. If it is clear that the han and fu yield more than mangan, the calculation of basic points is omitted
5. Calculating the basic points based on the fu and han
6. Multiplying the basic points depending on whether the winner is the dealer or non-dealer, and whether the hand is won by tsumo or ron
7. Adding bonuses based on the number of counters(8. Adjusting the payment by the wareme rule)

In the case of a draw, points are transferred according to the nō-ten bappu rule.  In the event of a penalty, such as claiming a win with an illegal hand, then points are transferred via the chombo rule.

Counting han
The total number of han (飜) of all the kinds of yaku (役; winning hand) in the hand is summed up. Each dora (ドラ) increases the han value of a hand. Dora are not regarded as yaku, and no hand can be won without a yaku even if there are some dora tiles.

If there is more than one way to arrange the winning hand, the arrangement with the highest han is used. For example, a hand could be either ryanpeikou (二盃口) or chītoitsu (七対子), but since ryanpeikou is three han where chītoitsu is two han, ryanpeikou should prevail. Some yaku have their han value reduced by one if the hand is not closed.

If a hand has five han or more, it is always counted by mangan (満貫) as a unit and it is not necessary to calculate fu (符) or basic points.

Counting fuFu (符) is counted in the order below and then rounded up to the tens. There may be variations of rules for counting it.

[Three han with 70 fu or more] and [four han with 40 fu or more] yield more than mangan and there is no need to calculate basic points. 

 A winning hand is automatically awarded 20 fu. This is called fūtei (副底).
 Ten fu are added if one wins by claiming a discarded tile with a closed hand.  This is called menzen-kafu (門前加符).
 Add fu of the melds and the pair. (See the list below.)
 Add fu according to how the waiting was. (See the list below.)
 Add two fu if one wins by self-draw. This way of winning is called tsumo (自摸, or ツモ). However, if the winning hand includes a yaku of no-points hand (pinfu, 平和), in most rules the two fu are not awarded and the hand is counted as a total of 20 fu.
 Winning with yaku which include seven pairs (chītoitsu, 七対子) is counted as 25 fu altogether. The value is not rounded up to the tens. Some rules say seven pairs has 50 fu and one han, especially in the Kansai region.
 As an exception, if one wins by claiming a discard with an open hand with melds and waits to which no fu is awarded, the hand is not 20 fu but counted as a total of 30 fu. This is the fu for an open pinfu.

Fu of melds
The list for the third step:

Fu of waits
The list for the fourth step:

Calculating basic points
The basic points of a hand is calculated as follows:

[ basic points = fu × 2(2+han) ]

When a non-dealer (ko, 子: child) goes out by self-draw, the dealer (oya, 親: parent) pays the winner 2 × basic points, and the other two non-dealers pay the winner 1 × basic points.
When a non-dealer goes out by discard, the discarding player pays the winner 4 × basic points.
When the dealer goes out by self-drawn, all the three non-dealers pay the winner 2 × basic points.
When the dealer goes out by discard, the discarding non-dealer pays the winner 6 × basic points.

The actual points given are rounded up to the nearest 100. Even if the values of han and fu are the same, the points received for self-draw wins often slightly deviate from those received for discard wins because of rounding.

Example calculations
Example 1: The player on the right of the dealer goes out by self-draw. (The dealer's wind is always East in Japanese rules.) The winner's hand is closed and has a closed triplet (ankō) of Souths. The player also has two Whites as the pair (toitsu) and the winning tile is a White. The yaku are "self-pick" (menzenchin-tsumo-hō) and "honor tiles" (yakuhai), and they yield a total of two han. The sum of fu is 20 (fūtei) + 8 (a closed triplet of Souths) + 2 (a pair of Whites) + 2 (pair wait) + 2 (self-draw) = 34 fu, rounded up to 40 fu.

The basic points are thus 40 × 2(2+2) = 640. The dealer pays the winner 640 × 2 = 1,280, rounded up to 1,300 points. The other two non-dealers pay the winner 640, rounded up to 700 points.

Example 2: The same player goes out by the same hand, except this time the winning tile was discarded by the player on the right. The resulting hand has one han of honor tiles. The number of fu is 20 (fūtei) + 10 (ron with a closed hand) + 8 (a closed triplet of Souths) + 2 (the pair of Whites) + 2 (pair wait) = 42 fu, rounded up to 50 fu.

The basic point is thus 50 × 2(2+1) = 400. The discarder pays the winner 400 × 4 = 1,600 points. The other two players pay the winner nothing.

One han 110 fu
It is possible for a hand to have one han with 102 fu (rounded up to 110 fu) if the rules allow a pair to have four fu when it is made of wind tiles that are both the seat wind and the prevailing wind. Some rules consider that such a pair is still worth two fu, making the hand have exactly 100 fu.

An example of a hand that has one han with 110 fu.
25px25px25px, closed 25px25px, closed 25px25px, winning by a discard .

The hand has yakuhai of one han with 20 fu of fūtei, 10 fu of menzen-kafu, 32 fu of ankan, 32 fu of ankan, four fu of minkō, and four fu of toitsu. East is both the player's seat wind and the round's prevailing wind in this case. This is the largest amount of fu that a hand with one han can have.

Scoring table
The method of calculating a winning hand's score in mahjong is quite tedious.  Instead, hand values are fixed into a scoring table. Expert and professional players have this table memorized and can thus tell the value of a hand at a glance.  Each of the table's point values is derived from the scoring equation and procedure with each corresponding han and fu values.

To use the table, simply look up the values that correspond to the han and fu counts of the hand.  The top numbers in each cell indicate the payout from a player who discards a winning tile. The numbers in brackets indicate the payout for each player in the event the winning tile is self-drawn.  If the winner is the dealer, each player pays the same amount. If the winner is a non-dealer, then the other two non-dealers pay the smaller number, while the dealer pays the larger number.

The reason why there are no scores in the 1 han 20 fu cell is that such a hand is impossible. The only 20 fu hands are the no-points hand (pinfu, 平和) where the winning tile is self-drawn. However, since a no-points hand must be closed, it makes winning via a self-drawn tile automatically add 1 han yaku of self pick to the hand. Therefore, a 1 han 20 fu hand cannot exist.  A seven pairs hand is fixed at 25 fu.  Since the hand is always closed, it adds 1 han of self pick when won by self-draw.

Mangan
When it is clear that a hand reaches basic points of more than 2,000, it is limited to full basic points of 2,000 and called mangan (満貫). A hand of five han or more is always counted as a multiple of mangan. In those cases, there is no need to calculate basic points.

One han cannot reach mangan because 110 fu × 2(2+1) = 880 < 2,000. (With one han, 110 fu is the maximum.)

Two han cannot reach mangan because 110 fu × 2(2+2) = 1,760 < 2,000. (With two han, 110 fu is also the maximum.)

When a hand has 120 fu or more, it always has some yaku of three han or more.

Exhaustive draws
On plenty of occasions, a hand ends with all tiles drawn and the 14 tiles in the dead wall remain.  Yet, no player wins the hand.  This is the exhaustive draw.  In this case, points may be exchanged barring any tenpai hands vs nōten hands.  After each exhaustive draw, the counter increases by one.

TenpaiTenpai (聴牌) means one tile short of a winning hand. To be tenpai, a hand does not need any particular yaku partly because winning by the last discard is yaku itself. When a hand is not tenpai, the situation is called nōten (ノー聴: nō is English "no" and ten for tenpai). 

Players must show their hand to verify that it is tenpai when a hand is a draw and if they declared rīchi or if they declare tenpai. If a hand with rīchi declaration is nōten, a chombo penalty is imposed. In some cases, a player who didn't declare rīchi can declare nōten even when the hand is tenpai to keep their hand concealed.

Point exchange
Players receive or pay points called nō-ten bappu (ノー聴罰符; fu of penalty for nōten) in the following way when a hand ends in an exhaustive draw: 
 (1) one player is in a state of tenpai, the player gets 1,000 points from each of the other three players and receives total of 3,000.
 (2) two players are tenpai, they get 1,500 each and the other two players pay 1,500 each.
 (3) three players are tenpai, they get 1,000 each and the other player pays 3,000.
 (4) the players are all  tenpai or all nōten, no payment is made.

In most rules when a dealer's hand is nōten, the dealer changes and the game wind may change. But if it's the last hand of the last round, in some rules, a game does not end if the dealer declares nōten.

Counters
When there are counter sticks (honba) on the table, winners get bonus points calculated by multiplying 300 by the number of those counters. Honba (本場) is a unit of continuous dealer wins and draws, and to be exact, hon (本) is a unit of numbers of some bars and so on, and ba (場) means a scene or a situation.

The dealer keeps count of the number of continuous dealer wins and draws by placing point sticks on the table. While point sticks are usually used for scoring, here they are used merely as counters, a visual aid. The initial count is zero. The number of counters increases by one when:
 (1) the dealer wins a hand
 (2) a hand is a draw (ryūkyoku, 流局)
 (3) an abortive draw happens. 

In the case of (1) or (3), the dealer remains the same. In the case of (2), when the dealer cannot declare tenpai, the dealer changes, but the number of counters increases regardless of whether the dealer declares tenpai. In all other cases, namely when only a non-dealer wins, the count is reset to zero.Renchan (連荘)  is a situation in which a player successively plays the dealer, and is often only caused by dealer's win or tenpai; therefore, draws are not always renchan. On the other hand, the number of honba always increases when a draw or a dealer's win occurs. If the dealer changes, it is called rinchan (輪荘) instead of renchan, and happens for example by their nōten in the case of a draw. 

In a state of n counters (suppose n is a number), when a player wins a hand by self-draw (tsumo), the player gets a bonus of n × 100 points from each of other three players for a total of n × 300, and when a player wins by claiming a discard (ron, 栄), the player gets a bonus of n × 300 from the discarder.

Example: 
 East round, 4th rotation with 0 counters (東4局0本場). The dealer (East) wins the hand. The seat winds don't rotate. Dealer puts 1 counter on the table.
 East round, 4th rotation with 1 counter (東4局1本場). Hand is a draw with the dealer not declaring tenpai. The seat winds rotate. The former dealer retrieves the 1 counter and the new dealer places 2 counters.
 South round, 1st rotation with 2 counters (南1局2本場). North wins by ron (claiming a discard), getting a bonus of 600 points from the discarder. The seat winds rotate and the former dealer retrieves the 2 counters.
 South round, 2nd rotation with 0 counters (南2局0本場).

Optionally, a rule may restriction of ryanhan-shibari (二飜縛り; literally "two-han binding").  Here, players must produce hands of two han or more from yaku when the honba count surpasses a certain number.  Usually, this count is five or more.

Chombo
Under the rule of chombo (チョンボ, 錯和 or 冲和), a player is given an infraction.  Point penalties vary by organizations and/or events.  Typically, a player pays a penalty of the same amount as mangan to other players in most rules. A non-dealer pays 4,000 to East and 2,000 to the other two players, while a dealer pays 4,000 to each. In other times, chombo does not affect the current score of the game; and instead, the penalty is applied at the end of the game.  Chombo occurs for any of the following:

 Invalidly claiming a winning hand
 Winning on a discard under the situation of sacred discard (furiten)
 Revealing a false rīchi, that is, rīchi with a hand that is not in the state of tenpai Closed kan after rīchi if the kan changes the hand structure (in other words a kan of a tile after rīchi is not allowed if the hand can be interpreted such that the tile is a part of a sequence)
 Having more tiles than allowed (depending on the rules)
 Knocking the wall over so that it cannot be recovered to the way it was before 

In game infractions, such as the false rīchi and invalid kan after rīchi, they are caught only after draws or winning declarations by players who declared the rīchi.  If other players happen to win the hand, then the infractions are not revealed and therefore made null and void.  Any rīchi bets are returned to the players after the end of a chombo hand.

Other settings for chombo apply point penalties after the game's conclusion.  This is especially the case under tournament settings.  Under this method, players do not benefit with any point gains.  Instead, the infracted player solely takes a point deduction.  The deduction may be set to any specified number.

Final points and place
At the end of the game, the final scores may be calculated.  Under casual game settings, this calculation is not necessary.  However, under more formal settings, it may be required.  This calculation takes the game's scores and adjusts them according the setting of oka and uma, which were predetermined before the game.  The calculation for each player is as follows:

 End score = ((End points + Oka - Target)/1000) + Uma

 End score - the final score for the player
 End points - the player's points at the end of the final hand
 Oka - the point difference between the target score and the initial score of all players given to the winner
 Target - the target score, or the minimum score needed for a player to be declared first or the winner
 Uma - a set of four numbers applied to each player's placement

Point settings may vary but are always determined prior to the beginning of a game.  In particular, different mahjong platforms utilize their own settings to uma.

Optional scoring rules

Wareme
In the optional rule wareme (割れ目, ワレメ; fissure, split), the player in front of whom the wall was split to indicate the end of the dead wall, acquires and pays double the normal points. They are doubled after the points for counters are added. It is often especially called oya-ware (親割れ; parent's wareme'') when the player is the dealer.

See also
 Scoring in Mahjong
 Japanese Mahjong yaku

Notes

References

External links
 European Mahjong Association's Riichi Ruleset

Game rules
Mahjong